A Different Drummer, also released as Superstar, is a 1971 big band recording by jazz drummer Buddy Rich for the RCA Records label.

Reception
The Allmusic review by Scott Yanow awarded the album 2.5 stars stating

Track listing
Source: Discogs

Tracks B3 – B6 make up the "A Piece of the Road" Suite

Personnel
Buddy Rich – drums
Bobby Peterson	– piano
David Spinozza	– guitar
Bob Daugherty – bass
Paul Kondziela	– bass
Candido Camero – bongos, conga
Phil Kraus – percussion
Brian Grivna – alto saxophone, flute, soprano saxophone
Jimmy Mosher – alto saxophone, flute, soprano saxophone
Pat LaBarbera	– tenor saxophone, flute, soprano saxophone
Don Englert – tenor saxophone, flute, soprano saxophone
Joe Calo – baritone saxophone, flute, soprano saxophone
Lin Biviano – trumpet
John DeFlon – trumpet
Wayne Naus – trumpet
Jeff Stout – trumpet
Bruce Paulson – trombone
Tony DiMaggio – trombone
John Leys – bass trombone

References

RCA LSP 4593
RCA INTERNATIONAL INTS 1475 (title "Superstar")

Buddy Rich albums
1971 albums
RCA Records albums